Holiday Soul is an album of Christmas music by the American jazz pianist Bobby Timmons, recorded in 1964 and released on the Prestige label.

Reception

The AllMusic review awarded the album 3 stars. DownBeat commented that Timmons played the Christmas material "without seeming the least bit self-conscious about his soul-jazz and blues tendencies". The All About Jazz reviewer also commented that the pianist retained his normal playing style despite the material. Critic Marc Myers selected it for his Vintage Holiday Album Hall of Fame in 2015.

Track listing
 "Deck the Halls" (Traditional) – 3:10
 "White Christmas" (Irving Berlin) – 7:00
 "The Christmas Song" (Mel Tormé, Robert Wells) – 5:15
 "Auld Lang Syne" (Robert Burns, Traditional) – 4:35
 "Santa Claus Is Coming to Town" (J. Fred Coots, Haven Gillespie) – 6:00
 "Winter Wonderland" (Felix Bernard, Richard B. Smith) – 5:30
 "We Three Kings" (John Henry Hopkins, Jr.) – 5:00
 "You're All I Want for Christmas" (Seger Ellis, Glen Moore) – 5:00
Recorded at Rudy Van Gelder Studio in Englewood Cliffs, New Jersey on November 24, 1964.

Personnel
Bobby Timmons - piano
Butch Warren - double bass
Walter Perkins - drums

References

Prestige Records albums
Bobby Timmons albums
1964 Christmas albums
Albums recorded at Van Gelder Studio
Albums produced by Ozzie Cadena
Christmas albums by American artists
Jazz Christmas albums